Nonadiabatic transition state theory (NA-TST) is a powerful tool to predict rates of chemical reactions from a computational standpoint. NA-TST has been introduced in 1988 by Prof. J.C. Lorquet. In general, all of the assumptions taking place in traditional transition state theory (TST) are also used in NA-TST but with some corrections. First, a spin-forbidden reaction proceeds through the minimum energy crossing point (MECP) rather than through transition state (TS). Second, unlike TST, the probability of transition is not equal to unity during the reaction and treated as a function of internal energy associated with the reaction coordinate. At this stage non-relativistic couplings responsible for mixing between states is a driving force of transition. For example, the larger spin-orbit coupling at MECP the larger the  probability of transition. NA-TST can be reduced to the traditional TST in the limit of unit probability.

References

Chemical physics